Justin J. Marcum is a former member of the West Virginia House of Delegates, representing Mingo and Logan Counties. Marcum also worked in the coal mines before becoming an attorney. He owns Marcum Law Office, PLLC in Williamson, West Virginia.

References

External links
 
Legislative page

Living people
Democratic Party members of the West Virginia House of Delegates
Politicians from Huntington, West Virginia
People from Williamson, West Virginia
American coal miners
21st-century American politicians
1969 births
Lawyers from Huntington, West Virginia